Ryan Hewitt is an American music producer, engineer and mixer known for his work with  The Lumineers, Red Hot Chili Peppers, The Avett Brothers, The Dixie Chicks, Third Eye Blind, Jamie Cullum, John Frusciante and the Turnpike Troubadours. Hewitt is a Grammy Award winner having received the accolade for mixing and engineering Red Hot Chili Peppers' ninth studio album Stadium Arcadium. The album received seven Grammy nominations and won in the categories of Best Rock Album and Best Boxed or Special Limited Edition Package. He is currently based in Nashville, TN.

Education and career
Hewitt grew up working with his father David Hewitt, a recording engineer. He went on to study at Tufts University in Boston, MA where he earned a Bachelor of Science in Electrical Engineering.  After establishing a rapport with Red Hot Chili Peppers guitarist John Frusciante, he went on to mix and engineer eight solo albums for Frusciante.

Hewitt moved from Los Angeles to Nashville in 2015 where he currently resides. Hewitt is based at the House of Blues Studios in Berry Hill, TN, where he mixed The Lumineers'  album Cleopatra as well as Long Way From Your Heart by the Turnpike Troubadors. He is currently represented exclusively by GPS management.

Selected discography

External links
 Ryan Hewitt Interview NAMM Oral History Library (2019)

References

Living people
American record producers
Tufts University School of Engineering alumni
Year of birth missing (living people)